Clare Cassell was a lawn tennis champion from the Bronxville Athletic Association. In 1913 she won the Montclair Athletic Club women's tournament, despite spraining her ankle.

References

American female tennis players
Year of birth missing
Year of death missing